The Office of Labor-Management Standards (OLMS) is an agency of the U.S. Department of Labor that promotes standards for democracy and fiscal responsibility in labor organizations.  It was formed in 1959.

Activities 
OLMS administers and enforces most provisions of the Labor-Management Reporting and Disclosure Act of 1959 (LMRDA).The LMRDA was enacted primarily to ensure basic standards of democracy and fiscal responsibility in labor organizations which represent employees in private industry. Unions representing U.S. Postal Service employees became subject to the LMRDA with the passage of the Postal Reorganization Act of 1970.

OLMS also enforces standards on officers of unions representing U.S. government workers defined by the Civil Service Reform Act of 1978.

History 
The agency was originally formed as the Bureau of Labor-Management Reports in 1959.  It was renamed the Labor-Management Services Administration in 1963, and the Office of Labor-Management Standards in 1984.

References

External links
 Office of Labor-Management Standards
 Office of Labor-Management Standards in the Federal Register

Office of Workers